The Alaska Governor's Mansion, located at 716 Calhoun Avenue in Juneau, Alaska, is the official residence of the governor of Alaska, the first spouse of Alaska, and their families.  It was designed by James Knox Taylor. The Governor's Mansion was first occupied in 1912 by Territorial Governor Walter Eli Clark.

History

The original budget for the 2½-story  frame structure and furnishing was $40,000 and included planned servants quarters and a territorial museum on the third floor which were never built.

The first floor includes a reception hall, drawing room, library, dining room, office, kitchen, two pantries, and a conservatory. The second floor contains four large bedrooms, a sewing room and three bathrooms.

In 1936 the wood finish of the exterior was plastered over and painted white.

Between 1939 and 1940, Tlingit carvers Charlie Tagook and William N. Brown crafted a totem pole that sits outside the mansion on commission from the Civilian Conservation Corps.

In 1967-68 two guest suites and one large bedroom were added to the third floor.

In 1983 a $2.5 million renovation that restored the interior decor to its original 1912 design also included new heating, electrical, plumbing and security systems.

In its current configuration the number of rooms in the mansion, excluding great halls, garages, closets, and bathrooms, is twenty-six.

Notable visitors
 President Warren G. Harding in 1923.
 Charles Lindbergh in 1969.
 Former President Gerald R. Ford in 1989.

See also
 List of governors of Alaska
 National Register of Historic Places listings in Juneau, Alaska

References

External links

 Office of the Governor of Alaska
 

1912 establishments in Alaska
Colonial Revival architecture in Alaska
Government buildings on the National Register of Historic Places in Alaska
Governors' mansions in the United States
Historic American Buildings Survey in Alaska
Houses completed in 1912
Governor
Governor
Buildings and structures on the National Register of Historic Places in Juneau, Alaska
Neoclassical architecture in Alaska